Strangers in Paradise is a 1984 American comedic science fiction musical film co-written, directed by, and starring Ulli Lommel. Its plot follows mesmerist Jonathan Sage, a Adol Hitler-lookalike who survives Nazi Germany by being cryogenically preserved, only to be thawed by fascist Americans who attempt to use him to rid their community of homosexuals, free-thinkers, and other "radicals". The film was co-written by Lommel's wife, Suzanna Love, who also appears in the film as a punk singer.

Cast

Production
Filming took place near Upland, California, in the summer of 1983. Additional photography occurred at Mt. Baldy Lodge and other locales in Rancho Cucamonga, California.

References

External links

1984 films
American musical comedy films
American science fiction films
American LGBT-related films
Films about Adolf Hitler
Films directed by Ulli Lommel
Films shot in California
Punk films